Cajatambo, Kashatampu, or Qaqatampu (Quechua) is one of five districts of the province Cajatambo in Peru.

Geography 
The Waywash mountain range traverses the district. Some of the highest peaks of the district are listed below:

See also 
 Quyllurqucha

References